Mom Rajawongse Nimitmongkol Navarat (21 April 190811 April 1948) was a Thai writer. He is best known for The Dreams of an Idealist.

Notes

References

1908 births
1948 deaths
20th-century male writers
Nimitmongkol Navarat
Nimitmongkol Navarat
Nimitmongkol Navarat